Redkino ( or ) is the name of several inhabited localities in Russia.

Republic of Bashkortostan
As of 2022, one rural locality in the Republic of Bashkortostan bears this name:
Redkino, Republic of Bashkortostan, a village in Kuyanovsky Selsoviet of Krasnokamsky District

Kaluga Oblast
As of 2022, two rural localities in Kaluga Oblast bear this name:
Redkino, Borovsky District, Kaluga Oblast, a village in Borovsky District
Redkino, Dzerzhinsky District, Kaluga Oblast, a village in Dzerzhinsky District

Kirov Oblast
As of 2022, one rural locality in Kirov Oblast bears this name:
Redkino, Kirov Oblast, a village in Krasnoyarsky Rural Okrug of Lebyazhsky District

Kurgan Oblast
As of 2022, one rural locality in Kurgan Oblast bears this name:
Redkino, Kurgan Oblast, a village in Rychkovsky Selsoviet of Belozersky District

Kursk Oblast
As of 2022, one rural locality in Kursk Oblast bears this name:
Redkino, Kursk Oblast, a khutor in Sedmikhovsky Selsoviet of Zolotukhinsky District

Leningrad Oblast
As of 2022, one rural locality in Leningrad Oblast bears this name:
Redkino, Leningrad Oblast, a village in Sabskoye Settlement Municipal Formation of Volosovsky District

Lipetsk Oblast
As of 2022, one rural locality in Lipetsk Oblast bears this name:
Redkino, Lipetsk Oblast, a village in Afanasyevsky Selsoviet of Izmalkovsky District

Moscow Oblast
As of 2022, eight rural localities in Moscow Oblast bear this name:
Redkino, Domodedovo, Moscow Oblast, a village under the administrative jurisdiction of the Domodedovo City Under Oblast Jurisdiction
Redkino, Gabovskoye Rural Settlement, Dmitrovsky District, Moscow Oblast, a village in Gabovskoye Rural Settlement of Dmitrovsky District
Redkino, Dmitrov Town, Dmitrovsky District, Moscow Oblast, a village under the administrative jurisdiction of  thetown of  Dmitrov, Dmitrovsky District
Redkino, Lotoshinsky District, Moscow Oblast, a village under the administrative jurisdiction of  the work settlement of  Lotoshino, Lotoshinsky District
Redkino, Naro-Fominsky District, Moscow Oblast, a village in Tashirovskoye Rural Settlement of Naro-Fominsky District
Redkino, Ozyorsky District, Moscow Oblast, a selo in Klishinskoye Rural Settlement of Ozyorsky District
Redkino, Ramensky District, Moscow Oblast, a village in Chulkovskoye Rural Settlement of Ramensky District
Redkino, Ruzsky District, Moscow Oblast, a village in Kolyubakinskoye Rural Settlement of Ruzsky District

Nizhny Novgorod Oblast
As of 2022, three rural localities in Nizhny Novgorod Oblast bear this name:
Redkino, Bor, Nizhny Novgorod Oblast, a selo in Redkinsky Selsoviet of the city of oblast significance of Bor
Redkino (selo), Zinyakovsky Selsoviet, Gorodetsky District, Nizhny Novgorod Oblast, a selo in Zinyakovsky Selsoviet of Gorodetsky District
Redkino (village), Zinyakovsky Selsoviet, Gorodetsky District, Nizhny Novgorod Oblast, a village in Zinyakovsky Selsoviet of Gorodetsky District

Oryol Oblast
As of 2022, two rural localities in Oryol Oblast bear this name:
Redkino, Kolpnyansky District, Oryol Oblast, a village in Krutovsky Selsoviet of Kolpnyansky District
Redkino, Livensky District, Oryol Oblast, a village in Vakhnovsky Selsoviet of Livensky District

Perm Krai
As of 2022, one rural locality in Perm Krai bears this name:
Redkino, Perm Krai, a village in Oktyabrsky District

Pskov Oblast
As of 2022, three rural localities in Pskov Oblast bear this name:
Redkino, Novorzhevsky District, Pskov Oblast, a village in Novorzhevsky District
Redkino, Ostrovsky District, Pskov Oblast, a village in Ostrovsky District
Redkino, Pytalovsky District, Pskov Oblast, a village in Pytalovsky District

Smolensk Oblast
As of 2022, one rural locality in Smolensk Oblast bears this name:
Redkino, Smolensk Oblast, a village in Pigulinskoye Rural Settlement of Kholm-Zhirkovsky District

Tambov Oblast
As of 2022, one rural locality in Tambov Oblast bears this name:
Redkino, Tambov Oblast, a village in Vishnevsky Selsoviet of Staroyuryevsky District

Tver Oblast
As of 2022, five inhabited localities in Tver Oblast bear this name.

Urban localities
Redkino, Konakovsky District, Tver Oblast, an urban-type settlement in Konakovsky District

Rural localities
Redkino, Oleninsky District, Tver Oblast, a village in Oleninsky District
Redkino, Rzhevsky District, Tver Oblast, a village in Rzhevsky District
Redkino, Torzhoksky District, Tver Oblast, a village in Torzhoksky District
Redkino, Vyshnevolotsky District, Tver Oblast, a village in Vyshnevolotsky District

Vologda Oblast
As of 2022, one rural locality in Vologda Oblast bears this name:
Redkino, Vologda Oblast, a village in Markovsky Selsoviet of Vologodsky District